Springmann is a surname. Notable people with the surname include:

Henry Springmann (1859–1936), British rugby union player
Michael Springmann, American civil servant
Theresa Lazar Springmann (born 1956), American judge